Pamela Kristina Alselind, (born 13 March 1965) is a Swedish journalist that writes for Expressen and the magazine Amelia. In 2006 she participated in the SVT show På spåret along with Tomas Bolme.

Since 1993, she has also been a member of the sports panel at Gomorron Sverige, which is broadcast on SVT. She was the editor in chief for the magazine Queen. And she is since 2010 the editor in chief for the magazine S.

Andersson is a cancer survivor.

References

External links

Living people
1965 births
Swedish journalists
Place of birth missing (living people)